The Lihir language is an Austronesian language spoken in the Lihir island group, in New Ireland Province, Papua New Guinea.  It is notable for having five levels of grammatical number: singular, dual, trial, paucal and plural. It is questionable whether the trial is indeed trial or whether it is paucal, leaving there being a paucal and a greater paucal. Either way, this is the highest number of levels of grammatical number in any language. This distinction appears in both independent pronouns and possessor suffixes. There is some variation in pronunciation and orthography between the main island Niolam, and some of the smaller islands in the group.

Name
The name Lihir is an exonym from the related Patpatar language. Natively, it is called , a cognate of the Patpatar name.

Phonology
Sources are indeterminate with regards to the phonemic status of different surface vowels, although minimal pairs provide evidence for the phonemic status of most vowel qualities.

References

External links
Lihir Phonology, from SIL

Languages of New Ireland Province
Meso-Melanesian languages